Andrey Makarov (Андрей Макаров; born  in Shyrgys Qazaqstan) is a Kazakhstani male weightlifter, competing in the 94 kg category and representing Kazakhstan at international competitions. He participated at the 1996 Summer Olympics in the 91 kg event and at the 2000 Summer Olympics in the 94 kg event. He competed at world championships, most recently at the 2003 World Weightlifting Championships.

Major results
 - 1995 World Championships Middle-Heavyweight class (380.0 kg)

References

External links
 

1972 births
Living people
Kazakhstani male weightlifters
Weightlifters at the 1996 Summer Olympics
Weightlifters at the 2000 Summer Olympics
Olympic weightlifters of Kazakhstan
Place of birth missing (living people)
Weightlifters at the 1994 Asian Games
Weightlifters at the 1998 Asian Games
Weightlifters at the 2002 Asian Games
Asian Games gold medalists for Kazakhstan
Asian Games medalists in weightlifting
Medalists at the 1994 Asian Games
Medalists at the 1998 Asian Games
20th-century Kazakhstani people
21st-century Kazakhstani people